The Wilten Boys' Choir is a part of the Premonstratensian , at the foot of Bergisel in Innsbruck, Austria. Founded in the mid-13th century, it is one of the oldest boys' choirs in Europe.

History 
The choir shares a common history with the Vienna Boys' Choir. According to contemporary sources, Emperor Maximilian I in 1498 established a court orchestra at Hofburg Palace in Vienna, including a choir which largely consisted of boys descending from Wilten in the County of Tyrol.

In 1946, the Wilten Boys' Choir was reestablished by Norbert Gerhold.

Education 
The choir currently consists of about 150 members, the youngest of which are about 6 years old. Following the change of voice, the boys can join the male voices and stay in the choir. The "concert choir" of the Wilten Boys' Choir is a special division of the Tiroler Landeskonservatorium.

Since 1991, Johannes Stecher is the choir's artistic director. Martin Pleyer and Vinzenz Arnold are in charge of organizational matters.

Repertoire 
The choir's repertoire includes a wide range, from sacred music to traditional alpine folk songs and opera.

During many concert tours, they have performed in Switzerland, Germany, Italy, France, Great Britain, Denmark, Romania, Israel and Japan.

External links 
 Official website

Austrian choirs
Choirs of children
Boys' and men's choirs
Organisations based in Innsbruck
Musical groups established in the 13th century